is the 18th single by Japanese singer/songwriter Chisato Moritaka. The lyrics were written by Moritaka and the music was composed by Hideo Saitō. The single was released by Warner Music Japan on April 10, 1993. The song was used by All Nippon Airways for their "ANA Okinawa" campaign.

Moritaka performed the song on the 44th Kōhaku Uta Gassen.

Music video 
The music video and commercial were set in the beaches of Okinawa, with additional scenes of Moritaka singing on a blue screen background displaying the sky, the beach, and a collage of her photos. ANA's campaign sparked controversy when University of the Ryukyus professor Kei Kohana noticed that the sky depicted in the commercial was too blue for an Okinawan summer. ANA and advertising agency Hakuhodo admitted that they sent Moritaka and the film crew to an island near Hamilton Island in Queensland, Australia due to Okinawa having a rainy season between May and June.

Chart performance 
"Watashi no Natsu" peaked at No. 5 on Oricon's singles chart and sold 382,000 copies. It was also Moritaka's first single to be certified Platinum by the RIAJ in April 1994.

Other versions 
Moritaka re-recorded the song as a slow acoustic version and uploaded the video on her YouTube channel on August 28, 2012. This version is also included in Moritaka's 2013 self-covers DVD album Love Vol. 2. She recorded another self-cover closer to the original and uploaded it on July 5, 2014. The 2014 version is also included in her 2015 self-covers DVD album Love Vol. 7.

Track listing

Personnel 
 Chisato Moritaka – vocals, drums
 Hideo Saitō – guitar, bass, synthesizer

Chart positions

Certification

References

External links 
 
 
 

1993 singles
1993 songs
Japanese-language songs
Chisato Moritaka songs
Songs with lyrics by Chisato Moritaka
Songs with music by Hideo Saitō (musician, born 1958)
Warner Music Japan singles